Paul Thomas Smalley (born 17 November 1966) is a former English footballer and coach.  In July 2020 he was reappointed as the technical director of the Bangladesh Football Federation.

Club career
Born in Nottingham, Smalley began his career in the academy of hometown club Notts County. Over the course of four years, Smalley made 118 Football League appearances for the club, before leaving to sign for Scunthorpe United in 1988, scoring one goal in 86 league games. In 1990, Smalley signed for Leeds United, however failed to make an appearance for the club, signing for Doncaster Rovers in 1991, making 14 league appearances. Following his time at Doncaster, Smalley dropped into Non-League football, playing for Sutton Town, Hucknall Town and Shepshed Dynamo.

Coaching career
Following his retirement, Smalley entered coaching, becoming a coach and regional director for The Football Association. In 2002, Smalley was appointed technical director for New Zealand Football. In 2008, after a stint in the United States, Smalley was named director of youth at Portsmouth. Following his spell at Portsmouth, Smalley took up roles in Oceania, working with clubs Northern Fury and Waitakere United, as well as working with the Football Federation Victoria and Football Federation Australia. In 2016, he was appointed technical and strategic director of the Bangladesh Football Federation. In November 2019, Smalley was appointed manager of Brunei. He left his post by mutual consent in May 2020. Smalley was given the duty of guiding the Bangladesh national under-20 football team during the 2022 SAFF U-20 Championship, while still being the technical director of BFF.

References

1966 births
Living people
Footballers from Nottingham
English footballers
Association football defenders
Notts County F.C. players
Scunthorpe United F.C. players
Blackpool F.C. players
Leeds United F.C. players
Doncaster Rovers F.C. players
Sutton Town A.F.C. players
Hucknall Town F.C. players
Shepshed Dynamo F.C. players
English Football League players
Brunei national football team managers
Expatriate football managers in Brunei
English football managers
English expatriate football managers
English expatriate sportspeople in Australia
English expatriate sportspeople in New Zealand
English expatriate sportspeople in Bangladesh
English expatriate sportspeople in Brunei
Northern Counties East Football League players
Association football coaches